Gomer Russell Wilson (July 8, 1901 in Trenton, Texas – September 15, 1946 in Sulphur Springs, Texas) was a baseball pitcher. He pitched in two games in Major League Baseball for the Brooklyn Robins during the 1924 baseball season.

External links

Major League Baseball pitchers
Brooklyn Robins players
Bridgeport Americans players
Albany Senators players
Reading Keystones players
Minneapolis Millers (baseball) players
Seattle Indians players
Baseball players from Texas
1901 births
1946 deaths
People from Trenton, Texas